The 1997 Brazilian Grand Prix was a Formula One motor race held at Autódromo José Carlos Pace near Interlagos, Brazil on 30 March 1997. It was the second race of the 1997 Formula One season. The 72-lap race was won by Williams driver Jacques Villeneuve after he started from pole position. Gerhard Berger finished second for the Benetton team and Prost driver Olivier Panis was third.

Summary

Pre-race
Having failed to qualify for the previous race in Australia, things went from bad to worse for Lola as the Huntingdon-based based team arrived in Brazil still not having received any money from title sponsor MasterCard. Already several million dollars in debt, the team returned to base without completing a lap of the circuit. A few days later, the team officially withdrew from the championship.

Qualifying
Jacques Villeneuve took his third consecutive, and his career fifth, pole position after a 1:16.004, over half a second faster than Michael Schumacher in second. Gerhard Berger and Mika Häkkinen completed the second row.

Race
The race was red-flagged after several incidents at the original start. Jacques Villeneuve went off the track at the first corner. Behind him, an incident involved several drivers including Damon Hill, Eddie Irvine, Giancarlo Fisichella and Jan Magnussen. Irvine took some blame for the incident. Additionally, Rubens Barrichello's car failed on the line, and the track blockage was what ultimately caused the red flag. Barrichello took the restart in the spare Stewart, causing Magnussen to miss the race.

The race was restarted with all 72 laps still remaining. Villeneuve had a clean start, as did the rest of the field. At the end of the first lap Villeneuve passed Michael Schumacher to retake the lead. Later before the first pit stops Berger would also pass Schumacher down the pit straight into the first corner. Irvine came into the pits mid-race, having been suffering from enormous pain due to his belts tightening up in the cockpit.

Damon Hill was once again affected by reliability issues, his engine failing with four laps remaining. He was running in fourth place at one point, but had slipped down the field before retiring in the pits with an engine bay fire caused by an oil leak. The winner of the previous race, David Coulthard, was off the pace and finished in 10th place.

Classification

Qualifying

Race

Championship standings after the race 

Drivers'   Championship standings

Constructors'   Championship standings

 Note:   Only the top five positions are included for both sets of standings.

References 

Race Details: 

Brazilian Grand Prix
Brazilian Grand Prix
Grand Prix
Brazilian Grand Prix